Horace Junior Grant Sr. (born July 4, 1965) is an American former professional basketball player who is a special advisor for Michael Reinsdorf, the president and chief operating officer of the Chicago Bulls. He attended and played college basketball at Clemson University before playing professionally in the National Basketball Association (NBA), where he became a four-time champion with the Chicago Bulls and Los Angeles Lakers.  Horace is the twin brother of former NBA player Harvey Grant.

Early life and college 
Grant was born in Augusta, Georgia. He and his twin brother, Harvey, grew up in Mitchell, Georgia and attended school in Sparta, Georgia.

After he graduated from high school, he attended Clemson University, where he was a member of Pi Kappa Alpha. With the Clemson Tigers, he became the first player in ACC history to lead the league in scoring (21.0 average), rebounding (9.6) and field goal shooting (70.8 percent). In 1987, Grant helped lead Clemson to the NCAA Tournament and was named ACC Player of the Year, becoming the first Clemson player to receive that honor.

NBA career

Chicago Bulls (1987–1994) 

Grant was drafted by the Chicago Bulls with the 10th overall pick of the 1987 NBA draft. The 6 ft 10 in (2.08 m) tall power forward / center teamed with fellow draft-day acquisition Scottie Pippen to form the Bulls' forward tandem of the future, although he initially backed up incumbent Charles Oakley, one of the league's premier rebounders and post defenders.

In 1988, Grant moved into the starting lineup when Oakley was traded to the New York Knicks for center Bill Cartwright. He immediately became the Bulls' main rebounder, and established himself as the Bulls' third scoring option after Michael Jordan and Pippen, forming one of the league's best trios. Grant was noted for his defensive play; he was selected four times for the NBA All-Defensive Team. He helped Chicago win three consecutive NBA championships (1991, 1992, and 1993), securing the third with a last-second block on Kevin Johnson.

Grant, who was diagnosed with myopia and wore eyeglasses, began wearing goggles fitted with prescription lenses on the court starting with the 1990–91 season. The goggles soon became a trademark for Grant. Although he eventually received LASIK surgery to correct his sight, he continued to wear the goggles on the court after he had heard from parents that he had become an inspirational figure to children who wore eyeglasses.

After Jordan's first retirement following the 1992–93 season, Grant became the number-two star behind Pippen, and helped the Bulls push the Knicks to seven games in the second-round playoff series before being eliminated. Grant played in the 1994 NBA All-Star Game, posting four points and eight rebounds in 17 minutes. During the 1993–94 season he recorded career-best averages in scoring (15.1), rebounding (11.0), and assists (3.4).

Orlando Magic (1994–1999) 
Grant left the Bulls as a free agent and joined the Orlando Magic, led by Shaquille O'Neal and Penny Hardaway. On May 5, 1995, Grant made the final basket in Boston Garden history in Orlando's series-clinching victory over the Boston Celtics. Grant helped the Magic reach the 1995 NBA Finals, where they were swept in four games by the Houston Rockets. Grant spent the next several seasons with the Magic.

Seattle SuperSonics (1999–2000) 
Grant was traded to the Seattle SuperSonics along with 2000 and 2001 second round picks for Dale Ellis, Don MacLean, Billy Owens, and rookie Corey Maggette just before start of the 1999–2000 season.

Los Angeles Lakers (2000–2001) 
After one year with the Sonics, Grant was involved in a three-way trade in which Glen Rice of the Los Angeles Lakers was sent to New York, Patrick Ewing of the Knicks was sent to Seattle, and Grant to the defending champion Lakers, reuniting him with Shaquille O'Neal and former Bulls coach Phil Jackson. He helped them win another championship in the 2000–01 season.

Return to Orlando (2001–2002) 
In the offseason, Grant decided to leave Los Angeles and sign back with the Orlando Magic. The Los Angeles Lakers would go on to win the 2002 NBA championship without Grant. Grant was ultimately cut by the Magic in December 2002 after then-coach Doc Rivers said Grant had tried to undermine the coach and was a "cancer" on the team.

Return to Los Angeles (2003–2004) 

Grant chose to retire after getting cut by the Magic. However, he decided to return for another run with the Lakers for the 2003–04 season as a backup to Karl Malone. He then retired permanently following the Lakers' loss to the Detroit Pistons in the 2004 NBA Finals.

Post-retirement
In 2009 Grant was appointed NBA Goodwill Ambassador.

In 2016 he became Special Advisor for Michael Reinsdorf, the president and chief operating officer of the Chicago Bulls.

Personal life
Grant's identical twin brother, Harvey Grant, played 11 NBA seasons for the Washington Bullets/Wizards, Portland Trail Blazers, and Philadelphia 76ers.

Grant was best friends with former teammate Scottie Pippen for many years when they were both on the Bulls. He said they grew apart when he left Chicago for Orlando, but that they are still friends and keep in touch.

When asked why he wore his signature goggles, Grant said he originally wore them because he was legally blind, but even after receiving Lasik surgery, he continued wearing his goggles without the prescription in order to remain a positive influence so kids who needed glasses would think it's cool. 

Though it has never been confirmed, Grant is rumored to be the main source for the material behind Sam Smith's controversial book The Jordan Rules, alongside former Bulls assistant coach Johnny Bach.

Three of Grant's nephews are also basketball players. Jerai Grant played college basketball for Clemson University and currently plays overseas; Jerian Grant played for the University of Notre Dame Fighting Irish men's basketball team and currently plays for Olimpia Milano; and Jerami Grant played for the Syracuse University Orange men's basketball team and currently plays for the Portland Trail Blazers.

Horace has three sons (Deon, Horace Jr, and Elijah) and five daughters (Coriel, Gianna, Maia, Naomi, and Eva).

NBA career statistics

Regular season

|-
| style="text-align:left;"|
| style="text-align:left;"|Chicago
| 81 || 6 || 22.6 || .501 || .000 || .626 || 5.5 || 1.1 || .6 || .7 || 7.7
|-
| style="text-align:left;"|
| style="text-align:left;"|Chicago
| 79 || 79 || 35.6 || .519 || .000 || .704 || 8.6 || 2.1 || 1.1 || .8 || 12.0
|-
| style="text-align:left;"|
| style="text-align:left;"|Chicago
| 80 || 80 || 34.4 || .523 ||  || .699 || 7.9 || 2.8 || 1.2 || 1.1 || 13.4
|-
| style="text-align:left; background:#afe6ba;"|
| style="text-align:left;"|Chicago
| 78 || 76 || 33.9 || .547 || .167 || .711 || 8.4 || 2.3 || 1.2 || .9 || 12.8
|-
| style="text-align:left; background:#afe6ba;"|
| style="text-align:left;"|Chicago
| 81 || 81 || 35.3 || .578 || .000 || .741 || 10.0 || 2.7 || 1.2 || 1.6 || 14.2
|-
| style="text-align:left; background:#afe6ba;"|
| style="text-align:left;"|Chicago
| 77 || 77 || 35.6 || .508 || .200 || .619 || 9.5 || 2.6 || 1.2 || 1.2 || 13.2
|-
| style="text-align:left;"|
| style="text-align:left;"|Chicago
| 70 || 69 || 36.7 || .524 || .000 || .596 || 11.0 || 3.4 || 1.1 || 1.2 || 15.1
|-
| style="text-align:left;"|
| style="text-align:left;"|Orlando
| 74 || 74 || 36.4 || .567 || .000 || .692 || 9.7 || 2.3 || 1.0 || 1.2 || 12.8
|-
| style="text-align:left;"|
| style="text-align:left;"|Orlando
| 63 || 62 || 36.3 || .513 || .167 || .734 || 9.2 || 2.7 || 1.0 || 1.2 || 13.4
|-
| style="text-align:left;"|
| style="text-align:left;"|Orlando
| 67 || 67 || 37.3 || .515 || .167 || .715 || 9.0 || 2.4 || 1.5 || 1.0 || 12.6
|-
| style="text-align:left;"|
| style="text-align:left;"|Orlando
| 76 || 76 || 36.9 || .459 || .000 || .678 || 8.1 || 2.3 || 1.1 || 1.0 || 12.1
|-
| style="text-align:left;"|
| style="text-align:left;"|Orlando
| 50 || 50 || 33.2 || .434 || .000 || .671 || 7.0 || 1.8 || .9 || 1.2 || 8.9
|-
| style="text-align:left;"|
| style="text-align:left;"|Seattle
| 76 || 76 || 35.4 || .444 || .000 || .721 || 7.8 || 2.5 || .7 || .8 || 8.1
|-
| style="text-align:left; background:#afe6ba;"|
| style="text-align:left;"|L.A. Lakers
| 77 || 77 || 31.0 || .462 || .000 || .775 || 7.1 || 1.6 || .7 || .8 || 8.5
|-
| style="text-align:left;"|
| style="text-align:left;"|Orlando
| 76 || 76 || 29.1 || .513 ||  || .721 || 6.3 || 1.4 || .8 || .6 || 8.0
|-
| style="text-align:left;"|
| style="text-align:left;"|Orlando
| 5 || 1 || 17.0 || .520 ||  ||  || 1.6 || 1.4 || .6 || .0 || 5.2
|-
| style="text-align:left;"|
| style="text-align:left;"|L. A. Lakers
| 55 || 10 || 20.1 || .411 || .000 || .722 || 4.2 || 1.3 || .4 || .4 || 4.1
|- class="sortbottom"
| style="text-align:center;" colspan="2" |Career
| 1,165 || 1,037 || 33.2 || .509 || .063 || .692 || 8.1 || 2.2 || 1.0 || 1.0 || 11.2
|- class="sortbottom"
| style="text-align:center;" colspan="2" |All-Star
| 1 || 0 || 17.0 || .250 ||  ||  || 8.0 || 2.0 || 1.0 || 2.0 || 4.0

Playoffs

|-
| style="text-align:left;"|1988
| style="text-align:left;"|Chicago
| 10 || 0 || 29.9 || .568 || .000 || .600 || 7.0 || 1.6 || 1.4 || .2 || 10.1
|-
| style="text-align:left;"|1989
| style="text-align:left;"|Chicago
| 17 || 17 || 36.8 || .518 ||  || .800 || 9.8 || 2.1 || .6 || .9 || 10.8
|-
| style="text-align:left;"|1990
| style="text-align:left;"|Chicago
| 16 || 16 || 38.5 || .509 || .000 || .623 || 9.9 || 2.5 || 1.1 || 1.1 || 12.2
|-
| style="text-align:left; background:#afe6ba;"|1991
| style="text-align:left;"|Chicago
| 17 || 17 || 39.2 || .583 ||  || .733 || 8.1 || 2.2 || .9 || .4 || 13.3
|-
| style="text-align:left; background:#afe6ba;"|1992
| style="text-align:left;"|Chicago
| 22 || 22 || 38.9 || .541 || .000 || .671 || 8.8 || 3.0 || 1.1 || 1.8 || 11.3
|-
| style="text-align:left; background:#afe6ba;"|1993
| style="text-align:left;"|Chicago
| 19 || 19 || 34.3 || .546 ||  || .685 || 8.2 || 2.3 || 1.2 || 1.2 || 10.7
|-
| style="text-align:left;"|1994
| style="text-align:left;"|Chicago
| 10 || 10 || 39.3 || .542 || 1.000 || .738 || 7.4 || 2.6 || 1.0 || 1.8 || 16.2
|-
| style="text-align:left;"|1995
| style="text-align:left;"|Orlando
| 21 || 21 || 41.4 || .540 || .000 || .763 || 10.4 || 1.9 || 1.0 || 1.1 || 13.7
|-
| style="text-align:left;"|1996
| style="text-align:left;"|Orlando
| 9 || 9 || 37.1 || .649 ||  || .867 || 10.4 || 1.4 || .8 || .7 || 15.0
|-
| style="text-align:left;"|1999
| style="text-align:left;"|Orlando
| 4 || 4 || 32.0 || .367 ||  || .625 || 7.0 || 1.3 || .5 || .5 || 6.8
|-
| style="text-align:left;"|2000
| style="text-align:left;"|Seattle
| 5 || 5 || 37.0 || .407 ||  || .500 || 6.2 || 2.0 || 1.6 || 1.0 || 4.8
|-
| style="text-align:left; background:#afe6ba;"|2001
| style="text-align:left;"|L.A. Lakers
| 16 || 16 || 26.4 || .385 ||  || .733 || 6.0 || 1.2 || .9 || .8 || 6.0
|-
| style="text-align:left;"|2002
| style="text-align:left;"|Orlando
| 4 || 4 || 31.8 || .364 ||  || 1.000 || 7.8 || 2.3 || .8 || .3 || 4.5
|- class="sortbottom"
| style="text-align:center;" colspan="2"|Career
| 170 || 160 || 36.3 || .530 || .125 || .714 || 8.6 || 2.1 || 1.0 || 1.0 || 11.2

See also
 List of National Basketball Association career rebounding leaders
List of National Basketball Association career minutes played leaders
 List of National Basketball Association career playoff rebounding leaders

References

External links
 

1965 births
Living people
African-American basketball players
All-American college men's basketball players
American men's basketball players
Basketball players from Augusta, Georgia
Centers (basketball)
Chicago Bulls draft picks
Chicago Bulls players
Clemson Tigers men's basketball players
Identical twins
Los Angeles Lakers players
National Basketball Association All-Stars
Orlando Magic players
Power forwards (basketball)
Seattle SuperSonics players
American twins
Twin sportspeople
21st-century African-American people
20th-century African-American sportspeople